Phuopsis stylosa, the Caucasian crosswort or large-styled crosswort, is a low-growing, mat-forming, aromatic perennial plant in the madder, or bedstraw family Rubiaceae. It has whorls of narrow, aromatic leaves and terminal clusters of tubular pink flowers. Phuopsis stylosa is native to the Caucasus and Iran, and is widely grown elsewhere as a garden plant.

The plant gives off an odor which can be confused with that of some Cannabis species.

References

External links 

 Crucianella stylosa
 Phuopsis stylosa at Royal Horticultural Society

Rubieae
Flora of Lebanon